The Man Is Back! is the self-produced seventeenth album by American R&B singer Barry White, which was released in 1989 on A&M Records. The first album of White's comeback phase, the album featured White incorporating a more contemporary production style while retaining the essential elements of his trademark sound, but the album was only a moderate seller, peaking at #22 on the R&B chart, only slightly higher than the disappointing showing of his A&M debut, The Right Night & Barry White. Critical reaction is generally positive, with the album being classed as a worthwhile and enjoyable, if not groundbreaking, addition to White's catalogue.

Track listing 
 "Responsible" (Barry White, Julian Jackson, Jack Perry) - 4:41
 "Super Lover" (White, Perry, William Jones) - 4:52
 "L.A. My Kinda Place" (White) - 4:50
 "Follow That and See (Where It Leads Y'All)" (White) - 5:04
 "When Will I See You Again" (White, Terrence Thomas) - 5:51
 "I Wanna Do It Good to Ya" (White, Rusty Hamilton III) - 6:00
 "It's Getting Harder All the Time" (Aaron Schroeder, David Grover) - 5:09
 "Don't Let Go" (White, Thomas, Chuckii Booker) - 9:08
 "Love's Interlude/Good Night My Love" (White) - 7:46

BACKUP SINGERS: Glodean White, Bridgette White, and Cydney Davis

Charts

Weekly charts

Year-end charts

Singles 
 "Super Lover" (US R&B #34)
 "I Wanna Do It Good to Ya" (US R&B #26)
 "When Will I See You Again" (US R&B #32)

References 

Barry White albums
1989 albums
A&M Records albums